In the United States, the term Nifty Fifty was an informal designation for a group of roughly fifty large-cap stocks on the New York Stock Exchange in the 1960s and 1970s that were widely regarded as solid buy and hold growth stocks, or "Blue-chip" stocks. These fifty stocks are credited by historians with propelling the bull market of the early 1970s, while their subsequent crash and underperformance through the early 1980s are an example of what may occur following a period during which many investors ignore fundamental stock valuation metrics, to instead make decisions on popular sentiment. Roughly half of the Nifty Fifty have since recovered and are solid performers, although a few are now defunct or otherwise worthless. 

Investor Howard Marks reports that about half of the Nifty Fifty "compiled respectable returns for 25 years, even when measured from their pre-crash highs, suggesting that very high valuations can be fundamentally justified." On the other hand, Professor Jeremy Siegel analyzed the Nifty Fifty era in his book Stocks for the Long Run, and determined companies that routinely sold for P/E ratios above 50 consistently performed worse than the broader market (as measured by the S&P 500) in the next 25 years, with only a few exceptions.

Characteristics
The stocks were often described as "one-decision", as they were viewed as extremely stable, even over long periods of time.

The most common characteristic by the constituents were solid earnings growth for which these stocks were assigned extraordinary high price–earnings ratios. Trading at fifty times earnings or higher was common, far above the long-term market average of about 15 to 20.

NYSE Nifty Fifty constituents
Note: There is no official version of companies composing the list, but the following companies were often included among the Nifty Fifty: 

 American Express
 American Home Products
 American Hospital Supply Corporation
 AMP Inc.
 Anheuser-Busch
 Avon Products
 Baxter International
 Black & Decker
 Bristol-Myers
 Burroughs Corporation
 Chesebrough-Ponds
 The Coca-Cola Company
 Digital Equipment Corporation
 Dow Chemical
 Eastman Kodak
 Eli Lilly and Company
 Emery Air Freight
 First National City Bank
 General Electric
 Gillette
 Halliburton
 Heublein
 IBM
 International Flavors and Fragrances
 International Telephone and Telegraph
 JCPenney
 Johnson & Johnson
 Louisiana Land & Exploration
 Lubrizol
 Minnesota Mining and Manufacturing (3M)
 McDonald's
 Merck & Co.
 MGIC Investment Corporation
 PepsiCo
 Pfizer
 Philip Morris Cos.
 Polaroid
 Procter & Gamble
 Revlon
 Schering Plough
 Joseph Schlitz Brewing Company
 Schlumberger
 Sears, Roebuck and Company
 Simplicity Pattern
 Squibb
 S.S. Kresge
 Texas Instruments
 Upjohn
 The Walt Disney Company
 Walmart
 Xerox

U.S. bear market of the 1970s
The long bear market of the 1970s which began with the 1973–74 stock market crash and lasted until 1982 caused valuations of the nifty fifty to fall to low levels along with the rest of the market, with most of these stocks under-performing the broader market averages.  A notable exception was Wal-Mart, the best performing stock on the list, with a 29.65% compounded annualized return over a 29-year period. However, Wal-Mart's initial public offering was in 1970 and only started trading on the NYSE on August 25, 1972, at the end of the bull market.

Because of the under-performance of most of the nifty fifty list, it is often cited as an example of unrealistic investor expectations for growth stocks.

References

Stock market
Economic bubbles
History of stock exchanges in the United States